The 2007 NACAC Cross Country Championships took place on March 3, 2007.  The races were held at the United States Triathlon National Training Center in Clermont, Florida, United States.  Detailed reports of the event were given.

Complete results were published.

Medallists

Medal table (unofficial)

Note: Totals include both individual and team medals, with medals in the team competition counting as one medal.

Participation
According to an unofficial count, 124 athletes from 16 countries participated.

 (4)
 (1)
 (24)
 (4)
/ (2)
 (6)
 (20)
/ (3)
 México (5)
 (1)
 (24)
 (2)
 (1)
 (10)
 (16)
 (1)

See also
 2007 in athletics (track and field)

References

NACAC Cross Country Championships
NACAC Cross Country Championships
NACAC Cross Country Championships
NACAC Cross Country Championships
NACAC Cross Country
Cross country running in Florida
Track and field in Florida
Clermont, Florida